Interrabang is a 1969 Italian giallo film directed by Giuliano Biagetti, starring Haydee Politoff and Beba Lončar. The title refers to the "Interrobang" (‽), a punctuation mark that combines a question mark and an exclamation mark, which appears on a necklace worn by Politoff's character Valeria throughout the film.

Plot
One summer day, famous fashion photographer Fabrizio sails to a Mediterranean small island for a shoot, accompanied by his business partner wife Anna, Israeli model Maregalit, and Anna's sister Valeria. A radio news bulletin reports that an escaped convict has murdered a policeman and is still on the run. The group discover that their boat has run out of fuel, and Fabrizio hitches a ride on a passing speedboat to return to the mainland in order to get a petrol can. So, the three women are left to explore the island and meet a mysterious man, Marco, who affirms to be a writer. They also discover the corpse of a policeman, which then disappears.

Cast
 Haydee Politoff as Valeria
 Corrado Pani as Marco
 Beba Lončar as Anna
 Umberto Orsini as Fabrizio
 Shoshana Cohen as Maregalit
 Edmondo Saglio as Policeman on boat
 Tellino Tellini as Policeman on boat
 Antonietta Fiorito as Girl on speedboat

Home media
Interrabang was released on Region 2 DVD in Italy in 2012, however the release does not include English subtitles.

Soundtrack
The soundtrack to Interrabang, composed by Berto Pisano, was released on CD in Italy in 2005.

References

External links
 
 Interrabang at Variety Distribution
  Information about the film's soundtrack

1969 films
1960s Italian-language films
Italian crime thriller films
Italian drama films
Giallo films
Films directed by Giuliano Biagetti
Films scored by Berto Pisano
1960s Italian films